Çemberlitaş is a village in the Ovacık District, Tunceli Province, Turkey. The village is populated by Kurds of the Qoçan tribe and had a population of 16 in 2021.

The hamlets of Öğütlü and Yağmur are attached to the village.

Notable people 

 Fatih Mehmet Maçoğlu

References 

Kurdish settlements in Tunceli Province
Villages in Ovacık District